Cory “Poop” Johnson (born April 10, 1992) is a gridiron football defensive lineman who is currently a free agent. He most recently played for the Toronto Argonauts of the Canadian Football League (CFL). He played college football at Kentucky. Johnson has also been a member of the Atlanta Falcons and Kansas City Chiefs of the National Football League, in addition to the Winnipeg Blue Bombers and Saskatchewan Roughriders in the CFL.

Early life and college career
Johnson moved from South Carolina to Pennsylvania during his childhood, where he attended Chambersburg Area Senior High School. He played defensive end and defensive tackle for the Chambersburg football team, also doing shot put for the track team. After initially signing with Temple, he later decided to attend ASA College, a junior college in Brooklyn, New York, where he earned multiple accolades on the football team before transferring to Kentucky. He played sporadically as a junior but became a full-time starter as a senior. During his time on the Wildcats, Johnson, listed as a defensive tackle, recorded 77 total tackles, 12 for a loss, 4.5 sacks, and had an interception and a recovered fumble, the latter of which he returned for a 77-yard touchdown.

Professional career
Johnson signed as an undrafted free agent by the Atlanta Falcons following the 2016 NFL Draft. He was later waived on September 2, 2016. He was signed by the Kansas City Chiefs to its practice squad in December and was later signed to a Reserve/Future contract, but was cut on May 10, 2017.

Johnson then signed with the Winnipeg Blue Bombers in May 2017. With the Blue Bombers, he saw his first professional playing time, registering 28 tackles and 5 sacks during his tenure with Winnipeg. Johnson was released by the Blue Bombers in October 2018.

On November 2, 2018, Johnson signed with the Saskatchewan Roughriders.

On February 13, 2019, Johnson signed with the Toronto Argonauts. He played in the season opener, but was released on July 10, 2019.

Personal life
Johnson received his nickname during his time in Kentucky after a reporter asked him about his fluctuating weight. He quipped that it was because he "poops so much", which caught on with his teammates.

See also
List of NFL nicknames

References

External links
Kentucky bio

1992 births
Living people
American football defensive linemen
Canadian football defensive linemen
American players of Canadian football
Kentucky Wildcats football players
Winnipeg Blue Bombers players
Saskatchewan Roughriders players
Players of Canadian football from Columbia, South Carolina
Toronto Argonauts players
Players of American football from Columbia, South Carolina